Água Grande is a district of São Tomé and Príncipe, on São Tomé Island.  Its capital, São Tomé, is also the national capital of the equatorial Atlantic island nation of São Tomé and Príncipe. Covering only , it is the smallest of the nation's seven districts in terms of area, but the largest in population with 69,454 residents in 2012 rising to an estimated 77,700 in 2018. It is divided into the two statistical subdistricts São Tomé and Pantufo.

Population

Settlements
The main settlement is the town São Tomé. Other settlements are:

Água Porca
Almeirim
Boa Morte
Chacara
Correia
Madre Deus
Oque del Rei
Pantufo 
Ponta Mina
Quinta Santo António
Riboque 
São João da Vargem
São Marçal

Politics
Água Grande currently has 13 seats in the National Assembly.

Persons
Marcos Barbeiro, footballer
Guadalupe de Ceita, medic and a politician
Manuel Pinto da Costa, politician, President of São Tomé and Príncipe from 2011 to 2016
Adimar Neves, footballer currently living in Europe
Lecabela Quaresma, athlete

International relations

Água Grande District is twinned with:

 Lisbon, Portugal

References

 
Districts of São Tomé and Príncipe
São Tomé Island